Avner “Abbie” Wolanow was an American soccer midfielder who played in the American Soccer League and earned one cap with the United States men's national soccer team.

Wolanow attended New York University, playing on the school's soccer team.  He played professionally for New York Hakoah of the American Soccer League from at least 1960 to at least 1963.

He earned his lone cap with the national team in a 2-0 loss to Colombia on February 5, 1961.

References

Living people
Israeli Jews
Jewish American sportspeople
Israeli footballers
Hapoel Tel Aviv F.C. players
Israeli emigrants to the United States
American soccer players
New York Hakoah-Americans players
American Soccer League (1933–1983) players
United States men's international soccer players
Association football midfielders
Year of birth missing (living people)
21st-century American Jews